The Palacio Cabanellas (Spanish, Cabanellas Palace) is a historical building in the city of Rosario, province of Santa Fe, Argentina. It is located in the downtown area, occupying the southwestern corner of San Luis St. and Sarmiento St.

The palace was projected around 1914 by the Majorcan architect Francisco Roca (Francesc Roca i Simó), who had been personally influenced by Antoni Gaudí during his studies in Barcelona. It was built in 1916 under the direction of Luis B. Laporte. It is one of very few examples of Modernisme (Catalan-style Art Nouveau) found in Rosario.

It was restored under official sponsorship during the mid-2000s, in order to repair fissures and replace outer details.

In 2006 the Palacio was one of the locations of the movie ¿De quién es el portaligas? (released 2007), directed by Rosario-born popular composer Fito Páez.

References

External links

 
 Works and sites of patrimonial value of the municipality of Rosario

Buildings and structures in Rosario, Santa Fe
Residential buildings completed in 1916
Modernisme architecture
Art Nouveau architecture in Argentina
Art Nouveau apartment buildings